The 1907 New South Wales state election was held on 10 September 1907 for all of the 90 seats in the 21st New South Wales Legislative Assembly and it was conducted in single-member constituencies with a first past the post voting system. Both adult males and females were entitled to vote, but not Indigenous people. The 20th parliament of New South Wales was dissolved on 19 August 1907 by the Governor, Sir Harry Rawson, on the advice of the Premier, Sir Joseph Carruthers.

Key dates

Results

{{Australian elections/Title row
| table style = float:right;clear:right;margin-left:1em;
| title        = New South Wales state election, 10 September 1907
| house        = Legislative Assembly
| series       = New South Wales state election
| back         = 1904
| forward      = 1910
| enrolled     = 745,900
| total_votes  = 458,408
| turnout %    = 66.72
| turnout chg  = +7.41
| informal     = 13,543
| informal %   = 2.87
| informal chg = +1.88
}}

|}

Retiring members

Changing seats

See also
 Candidates of the 1907 New South Wales state election
 Members of the New South Wales Legislative Assembly, 1907–1910

Notes

References

Elections in New South Wales
1907 elections in Australia
1900s in New South Wales
September 1907 events